Wrexham, like most major towns and cities has more than one railway station, Wrexham railway station may refer to:

 Wrexham Central railway station
 Wrexham General railway station
 Ruabon Interchange
 (Wrexham) Chirk railway station
 (Wrexham) Gwersyllt railway station